Multiple ships of the United States Navy have been named USS Quinnebaug.

  was a sloop-of-war, commissioned in 1867 and decommissioned in 1870.
  was a corvette, commissioned in 1878 and decommissioned in 1889.
 
 
  was a gasoline tanker.

United States Navy ship names